List of the Syrphidae of Ireland	Part of List of Diptera of Ireland
Anasimyia contracta Claussen & Torp, 1980
Anasimyia lineata (Fabricius, 1787)
Anasimyia lunulata (Meigen, 1822)
Anasimyia transfuga (Linnaeus, 1758)
Arctophila superbiens (Müller, 1776)
Baccha elongata (Fabricius, 1775)
Brachyopa insensilis Collin, 1939
Brachyopa scutellaris Robineau-Desvoidy, 1843
Brachypalpoides lentus (Meigen, 1822)
Brachypalpus laphriformis (Fallén, 1816)
Chalcosyrphus nemorum (Fabricius, 1805)
Cheilosia ahenea (von Roser, 1840)
Cheilosia albipila Meigen, 1838
Cheilosia albitarsis (Meigen, 1822)
Cheilosia antiqua (Meigen, 1822)
Cheilosia bergenstammi (Becker, 1894)
Cheilosia chrysocoma (Meigen, 1822)
Cheilosia grossa (Fallén, 1817)
Cheilosia illustrata (Harris, 1780)
Cheilosia impressa Loew, 1840
Cheilosia latifrons (Zetterstedt, 1843)
Cheilosia longula (Zetterstedt, 1838)
Cheilosia nebulosa (Verrall, 1871)
Cheilosia pagana (Meigen, 1822)
Cheilosia psilophthalma (Becker, 1894)
Cheilosia pubera (Zetterstedt, 1838)
Cheilosia scutellata (Fallén, 1817)
Cheilosia semifasciata (Becker, 1894)
Cheilosia uviformis (Becker, 1894)
Cheilosia variabilis (Panzer, 1798)
Cheilosia velutina Loew, 1840
Cheilosia vernalis (Fallén, 1817)
Cheilosia vicina (Zetterstedt, 1849)
Chrysogaster cemiteriorum (Linnaeus, 1758)
Chrysogaster solstitialis (Fallén, 1817)
Chrysogaster virescens Loew, 1854
Chrysotoxum bicinctum (Linnaeus, 1758)
Chrysotoxum cautum (Harris, 1776)
Chrysotoxum fasciatum (Müller, 1764)
Chrysotoxum festivum (Linnaeus, 1758)
Criorhina berberina (Fabricius, 1805)
Criorhina floccosa (Meigen, 1822)
Criorhina ranunculi (Panzer, 1804)
Dasysyrphus albostriatus (Fallén, 1817)
Dasysyrphus hilaris (Zetterstedt, 1843)
Dasysyrphus pinastri (De Geer, 1776)
Dasysyrphus tricinctus (Fallén, 1817)
Dasysyrphus venustus (Meigen, 1822)
Didea alneti (Fallén, 1817)
Didea fasciata Macquart, 1834
Doros profuges (Harris, 1780)
Epistrophe eligans (Harris, 1780)
Epistrophe grossulariae (Meigen, 1822)
Epistrophe nitidicollis (Meigen, 1822)
Episyrphus balteatus (De Geer, 1776)
Eriozona syrphoides (Fallén, 1817)
Eristalinus aeneus (Scopoli, 1763)
Eristalinus sepulchralis (Linnaeus, 1758)
Eristalis abusiva Collin, 1931
Eristalis arbustorum (Linnaeus, 1758)
Eristalis cryptarum (Fabricius, 1794)
Eristalis interruptus (Poda, 1761)
Eristalis intricarius (Linnaeus, 1758)
Eristalis lineata (Harris, 1776)
Eristalis pertinax (Scopoli, 1763)
Eristalis tenax (Linnaeus, 1758)
Eumerus funeralis Meigen, 1822
Eumerus strigatus (Fallén, 1817)
Eupeodes bucculatus (Rondani, 1857)
Eupeodes corollae (Fabricius, 1794)
Eupeodes latifasciatus (Macquart, 1829)
Eupeodes luniger (Meigen, 1822)
Fagisyrphus cinctus (Fallén, 1817)
Ferdinandea cuprea (Scopoli, 1763)
Helophilus hybridus Loew, 1846
Helophilus pendulus (Linnaeus, 1758)
Helophilus trivittatus (Fabricius, 1805)
Heringia heringi (Zetterstedt, 1843)
Heringia vitripennis (Meigen, 1822)
Lejogaster metallina (Fabricius, 1781)
Lejogaster tarsata (Meigen, 1822)
Leucozona glaucia (Linnaeus, 1758)
Leucozona laternaria (Müller, 1776)
Leucozona lucorum (Linnaeus, 1758)
Megasyrphus erraticus (Linnaeus, 1758)
Melangyna arctica (Zetterstedt, 1838)
Melangyna compositarum (Verrall, 1873)
Melangyna lasiophthalma (Zetterstedt, 1843)
Melangyna quadrimaculata Verrall, 1873
Melangyna umbellatarum (Fabricius, 1794)
Melanogaster aerosa (Loew, 1843)
Melanogaster hirtella (Loew, 1843)
Melanostoma mellinum (Linnaeus, 1758)
Melanostoma scalare (Fabricius, 1794)
Meligramma guttata (Fallén, 1817)
Meliscaeva auricollis (Meigen, 1822)
Meliscaeva cinctella (Zetterstedt, 1843)
Merodon equestris (Fabricius, 1794)
Microdon analis (Macquart, 1842)
Microdon mutabilis (Linnaeus, 1758)
Microdon myrmicae Schonrogge, Barr, Wardlaw, Napper, Gardner, Breen, Elmes & Thoma, 2002
Myathropa florea (Linnaeus, 1758)
Neoascia geniculata (Meigen, 1822)
Neoascia meticulosa (Scopoli, 1763)
Neoascia obliqua Coe, 1940
Neoascia podagrica (Fabricius, 1775)
Neoascia tenur (Harris, 1780)
Orthonevra geniculata (Meigen, 1830)
Orthonevra nobilis (Fallén, 1817)
Paragus constrictus Simic, 1986
Paragus haemorrhous Meigen, 1822
Parasyrphus annulatus (Zetterstedt, 1838)
Parasyrphus lineolus (Zetterstedt, 1843)
Parasyrphus malinellus (Collin, 1952)
Parasyrphus nigritarsis (Zetterstedt, 1843)
Parasyrphus punctulatus (Verrall, 1873)
Parasyrphus vittiger (Zetterstedt, 1843)
Parhelophilus consimilis (Malm, 1863)
Parhelophilus versicolor (Fabricius, 1794)
Pipiza austriaca Meigen, 1822
Pipiza bimaculata Meigen, 1822
Pipiza luteitarsis Zetterstedt, 1843
Pipiza noctiluca (Linnaeus, 1758)
Pipizella viduata (Linnaeus, 1758)
Platycheirus albimanus (Fabricius, 1781)
Platycheirus ambiguus (Fallén, 1817)
Platycheirus amplus Curran, 1927
Platycheirus angustatus (Zetterstedt, 1843)
Platycheirus clypeatus (Meigen, 1822)
Platycheirus discimanus (Loew, 1871)
Platycheirus fulviventris (Macquart, 1829)
Platycheirus granditarsus (Forster, 1771)
Platycheirus immarginatus (Zetterstedt, 1849)
Platycheirus manicatus (Meigen, 1822)
Platycheirus nielseni Vockeroth, 1990
Platycheirus occultus Goeldlin, Maibach & Speight, 1990
Platycheirus peltatus (Meigen, 1822)
Platycheirus perpallidus (Verrall, 1901)
Platycheirus podagratus (Zetterstedt, 1838)
Platycheirus ramsarensis Goeldlin, Maibach & Speight, 1990
Platycheirus rosarum (Fabricius, 1787)
Platycheirus scambus (Stæger, 1843)
Platycheirus scutatus (Meigen, 1822)
Platycheirus sticticus (Meigen, 1822)
Portevinia maculata (Fallén, 1817)
Rhingia campestris Meigen, 1822
Riponnensia splendens (Meigen, 1822)
Scaeva pyrastri (Linnaeus, 1758)
Scaeva selenitica (Meigen, 1822)
Sericomyia lappona (Linnaeus, 1758)
Sericomyia silentis (Harris, 1776)
Sphaerophoria batava Goeldlin, 1974
Sphaerophoria fatarum Goeldlin, 1989
Sphaerophoria interrupta (Fabricius, 1805)
Sphaerophoria loewi Zetterstedt, 1843
Sphaerophoria philantha (Meigen, 1822)
Sphaerophoria rueppelli (Wiedemann, 1830)
Sphaerophoria scripta (Linnaeus, 1758)
Sphegina clunipes (Fallén, 1816)
Sphegina elegans Schummel, 1843
Syritta pipiens (Linnaeus, 1758)
Syrphus rectus Osten Sacken, 1877
Syrphus ribesii (Linnaeus, 1758)
Syrphus torvus Osten Sacken, 1875
Syrphus vitripennis Meigen, 1822
Trichopsomyia flavitarsis (Meigen, 1822)
Tropidia scita (Harris, 1780)
Volucella bombylans (Linnaeus, 1758)
Volucella pellucens (Linnaeus, 1758)
Xanthandrus comtus (Harris, 1780)
Xanthogramma citrofasciatum (De Geer, 1776)
Xylota abiens Meigen, 1822
Xylota florum (Fabricius, 1805)
Xylota jakutorum Bagatshanova, 1980
Xylota segnis (Linnaeus, 1758)
Xylota sylvarum (Linnaeus, 1758)
Xylota tarda Meigen, 1822

References

Chandler, P.J., Nash, R, and O’Connor, J.P 2008 An Annotated Checklist of the Irish Two-winged flies (Diptera) The Irish Biogeographical Society and the National Museum of Ireland, Dublin
Chandler, P.J..1998 Checklist of Insects of the British Isles (New Series) Part 1: Diptera (Incorporating a List of Irish Diptera) Handbooks for the Identification of British Insects, Volume 12, 234 pages.
Speight, M.C.D. Species accounts pdf 
William Lundbeck,  1916. Lonchopteridae, Syrphidae. Diptera Danica 5. Copenhagen. BHL full text
Rotheray G., 1993 Colour Guide to Hoverfly Larvae Diptera, Syrphidae in Britain and Europe Dipterists Forum pdf

External links
World of Syrphidae

Ireland, syrphidae
Hoverflies
syrph